STI may refer to:

In science and technology

Biology and psychology
 Sexually transmitted infection
 Signal transduction inhibitor, a drug type
 Soft tissue injury
 Symptom targeted intervention, for treating depression

Electronics and computing
 Shallow trench isolation, prevents current leakage inside chips
 STI (x86 instruction), enables interrupts
 Still Image Architecture in MS Windows

Other uses in science and technology
 Shimano Total Integration, for bicycle gears 
 Speech transmission index, a measure of speech intelligibility
 Stationary target indication, a radar mode
 Subaru Impreza WRX STI, car models
 Verkehrsbetriebe STI, a bus operator, Bern, Switzerland

Businesses and organizations

Educational organizations
 Sail Training International
 STI College, Philippine IT network

In science and technology
 Semantic Technology Institute International
 Sega Technical Institute
 Subaru Tecnica International, motorsports division
 Sony, Toshiba, and IBM, co-developers of the Cell microprocessor

Other businesses and organizations
 Scottish Trade International (1991-2001), later Scottish Development International
 Canadian airline Sontair, ICAO code, see List of airline codes (S)

Other uses
 Cibao International Airport, IATA airport code
 Stieng language (ISO 639 code: "sti") of Vietnam/Cambodia
 Stirlingshire, historic county in Scotland, Chapman code
 Straits Times Index, a stock market index
 Shun Tin station, MTR station code

See also
 ST1 (disambiguation)